Joseph Loeb may refer to:

 Jeph Loeb, American film and television writer, producer and comic book writer
 Joseph P. Loeb (1883–1974), lawyer from Los Angeles, California